Television in Trinidad and Tobago was introduced in 1962 beginning with Trinidad & Tobago Television. TTT was the sole television station for 29 years being operated by the state until the first independently operated television station, the Caribbean Communications Network, CCN TV6 was launched in 1991 breaking the television monopoly market. In 1992, a second independently operated station, AVM Television was launched. The first independently operated cable station, The Trinity Network (TTN) now Trinity TV began operations in 1993 broadcasting on weekends only.

AVM Television was acquired by the state in 1997 and renamed The Information Channel (TIC) until it was leased by the National Carnival Commission in 2005 and re-branded NCC4. Once the lease ended in 2011, the state began controlling the station once more under the Government Information Services Limited (GISL TV4). The station was closed for three years and re-launched as the Education Channel in 2020.

TTT was shut down by the state on 14 January 2005 due to financial difficulties. In its place a new state entity was created, the Caribbean News Media Group (CNMG), where C Television (CTV) began broadcasting in 2006. Since the closure of TTT, new independently operated stations were launched, the most notable being the Cable News Channel 3 or CNC3. After several years of being off the air, it was found that TTT still had a strong brand identity among the population and a cult following on social media. On 30 August 2018, TTT was re-launched replacing CTV.

Broadcast networks in Trinidad and Tobago can be divided into three categories:
 Commercial broadcasting networks (which air English-language programming to a general audience). Example: CNC3
 Educational and other non-commercial broadcasting member stations (which air English- and some foreign-language television programming, intended to be educational television or otherwise of a sort not found on commercial television). Example: The Parliament Channel
 Religious broadcasting networks. Example: IBN

Table of broadcast networks
All of the networks listed below air on cable and satellite services.

Over-The-Air Television Networks

Trinidad and Tobago Television (TTT Channels 9 & 13) – (1962–2005 as Channels 2 & 13) – State owned television station re-launched in 2018.
CNC3 Television (CNC3) – National television station owned by Guardian Media Limited.
 The Caribbean Communications Network Limited (CCN TV6) – A national television station owned by OCM Ltd, publishers of the Barbados Nation and the Trinidad Express.
 Advance Community Television Station (ACTS25) – A religious community station serving the city of San Fernando.
 Parliament of the Republic of Trinidad and Tobago – (The Parliament Channel) – Broadcasts proceedings of the Parliament of Trinidad and Tobago.
 Tobago Channel 5 – Airs Tobago based programming – Broadcasts in Tobago only.

Non-Commercial Television Networks

 The Parliament Channel – Broadcasts proceedings of the Parliament of Trinidad and Tobago.
Education Channel (Channels 4 & 16) - State owned television re-launched in 2020 under the Ministry of Education.

Cable-Only Television Stations
 Darut Tarbiyah – The Islamic Network (TIN) – Broadcasts Islamic Programming.
 Gayelle Television (Gayelle) – Broadcasts local and cultural programming.
 TV Jaagriti – Broadcasts Hindu and Indian programming.
 ieTV (ieTV ) – Broadcasts Indian Cultural, current Affairs and News programmes.
 Islamic Broadcasting Network (IBN 8) – Broadcasts community and Islamic programming.
 Sankhya Television – Broadcasts Hindu and Indian programming.
 Synergy Entertainment Network Television (Synergy TV) – Music channel with original programming featuring local and Caribbean artistes.
 T&T Entertainment Network (TTEN) – Music channel with original programming featuring local and Caribbean artistes.
 Tobago Inspirational Network (TIN) - Broadcasts Christian programming in the isle of Tobago on the Trico Cable Network Channel 137.
 Trinity Communications Network (Trinity TV) – Formerly The Trinity Network (TTN) – Broadcasts Roman Catholic programming.
 "WE" Entertainment, Sport and News (WESN) - Broadcasts local and cultural programming.

Subscription Television Broadcasters
 bmobile (Telecommunications Services of Trinidad and Tobago Limited) – National
 Digicel – National
 DirecTV Limited – National
 Flow Trinidad (Cable & Wireless Communications) – National 
 Green Dot Limited – National
 Amplia (Formerly Massy Communications) – National
 Independent Cable Network of Trinidad and Tobago (ICNTT) – Major Territorial Network
 TRICO Industries Limited – Minor Territorial (Tobago only)
 Air Link Communications – Niche – Princes Town and Environs
 Mayaro Cable Television (MCTV) – Niche – Mayaro and Guayaguayare
 RVR International Limited – Niche – Princes Town and Rio Claro

Defunct Television Networks
Caribbean New Media Group Limited – (CTV Channels 9 & 13) – (2006–2018) – State owned national station.
Trinidad & Tobago Television (TTT Channels 9 & 14) – (1983–1990) – State owned television station.
AVM Television (Channels 4 & 16) – (1992–1996) – Privately owned television station.
The Information Channel (TIC Channels 4 & 16) – (1997–2005) – State owned television station.
National Carnival Commission (NCC TV4 Channels 4 & 16) – (2005–2011) – State owned television station.
Government Information Services Limited (GISL Channels 4 & 16) – (2011–2017) – State owned television station.
Caribbean Video Network (CVN) – (1996–2002) – Privately owned cable television network based in Tobago.
SUN TV – (1996–1998) – Privately owned cable television network.
West Indian Network (WIN TV) – (2007–2016) – Privately owned cable and over-the-air television station.

See also
 Communications in Trinidad and Tobago
 Radio in Trinidad and Tobago

References